Devashish Krishnakant Nilosey (born 4 December 1964) is an Indian cricketer and coach. He played in 46 first-class and 16 List A matches for Madhya Pradesh from 1984/85 to 1995/96. He was an all-rounder. As a batsman, he scored over 200 runs, including three centuries. His top score was 128, against Railways in December 1994. He was a right-arm seam bowler, whose best bowling performance was ten wickets against Vidarbha in November 1991. He holds the record for the worst economy rate in a Ranji Trophy season, with 4.54 in 1992/93.

Nilosey later coached Madhya Pradesh, as well as the India national under-19 cricket team.

See also
 List of Madhya Pradesh cricketers

References

External links
 

1964 births
Living people
Indian cricketers
Madhya Pradesh cricketers
Cricketers from Indore
Indian cricket coaches